The 2022 FAI Women's Cup (known as The EVOKE.ie FAI Women's Cup for sponsorship reasons) is the 47th edition of the Republic of Ireland's primary national knockout cup competition for women's association football teams. The ten Women's National League (WNL) teams entered the competition, as well as four non-league teams. The competition began on 9 July 2022 with the first round and concluded on 6 November 2022. The final was staged at the Tallaght Stadium in Dublin, which had also hosted the previous year's final.

The Cup holders Wexford Youths were eliminated at the semi-final stage.

First round

The draw for the first round took place on 21 June 2022. Gerry McAnaney conducted proceedings, assisted by Paula Gorham. 2021 finalists Shelbourne and Wexford Youths received a bye to the quarter-finals. Non-league clubs Douglas Hall, Whitehall Rangers, Bonagee United and Finglas United joined the eight remaining Women's National League (WNL) clubs. Teams in bold advanced to the quarter final. Sligo Rovers' received a walkover in their first ever Cup tie, when scheduled opponents Douglas Hall, from Cork, failed to fulfil the fixture. Kate Mooney's goal after 32 seconds in DLR Waves' 5–0 win over Treaty United was thought to be the quickest in competition history.

Quarter-finals 

The draw for the quarter-finals took place on 12 July 2022. Teams in bold advanced to the semi-finals.

Semi-finals 

The draw for the semi-finals was made on 9 August 2022. Both matches took place on 24 September 2022.

Final

References 

2022 FAI Women's Cup
FAI Women's Cup seasons
2022 in Irish sport
2022 in Republic of Ireland association football cups

External links
FAI Women's Senior Cup at Football Association of Ireland